Leucanopsis huaco is a moth of the family Erebidae. It was described by William Schaus in 1901. It is found in Brazil.

References

huaco
Moths described in 1901